The following are the football (soccer) events of the year 1951 throughout the world.

Events

Winners club national championship 
 : Racing Club
 : Tottenham Hotspur F.C.
 : OGC Nice
 : A.C. Milan
 : PSV Eindhoven
 : CCA București
 : Atlético Madrid
 : 1. FC Kaiserslautern

International tournaments
 Pan American Games in Buenos Aires, Argentina (25 February – 8 March 1951)
 Gold Medal: 
 Silver Medal: 
 Bronze Medal: 
 1951 Asian Games in New Delhi, India (5 – 10 March 1951)
 : 
 : 
 : 
1951 British Home Championship (7 October 1950 – 14 April 1951)

Births
 18. January – Renato Zaccarelli, Italian international footballer and manager 
 14 February – Kevin Keegan, English international footballer and manager
 21 February – Wolfgang Frank, German footballer and manager (died 2013)
 4 March – Kenny Dalglish, Scottish international footballer and manager
 11 April – Jim Holton, Scottish international footballer (died 1993)
 2 June – Antonio Benítez, Spanish international footballer (died 2014)
 21 September – Bruce Arena, American footballer and National Team coach
 23 September – Harry Lubse, Dutch international footballer
 12 October – István Halász, Hungarian international footballer (died 2016)
 3 November – François Bracci, French international footballer
 9 December – Dominique Dropsy, French international footballer (died 2015)

Deaths

January 
 26 January - Henri Bard, French footballer (born 1892)

May 
 9 May - Leo Bosschart, Dutch footballer (born 1888)

July 
 14 July - Ben Verweij (55), Dutch footballer (born 1895)

November 
 13 November – Walter de Souza Goulart, Brazilian goalkeeper, semi-finalist at the 1938 FIFA World Cup (born 1912)

 
Association football by year